This is a complete list of the local bargaining units of the Canadian Auto Workers (CAW) Union.

 Local 27
 Local 40
 Local 61
 Local 88
 Local 100
 Local 101
 Local 110 - now TCRC Division 105 Locomotive Engineers
 Local 111
 Local 112
 Local 114
 Local 127
 Local 144
 Local 195
 Local 199
 Local 200
 Local 219
 Local 222
 Local 229
 Local 240
 Local 252
 Local 275
 Local 302
 Local 333
 Local 350
 Local 385
 Local 397
 Local 414
 Local 432
 Local 444
 Local 462
 Local 483
 Local 510
 Local 512
 Local 523
 Local 567
 Local 584
 Local 598
 Local 599
 Local 636
 Local 673
 Local 676
 Local 707
 Local 830
 Local 991
 Local 1001
 Local 1090
 Local 1120
 Local 1256
 Local 1285
 Local 1451
 Local 1520
 Local 1524
 Local 1859
 Local 1941
 Local 1959
 Local 1967
 Local 1973
 Local 1995
 Local 1996
 Local 2000
 Local 2002
 Local 2003
 Local 2107
 Local 2169
 Local 2182
 Local 2200
 Local 2245
 Local 2301
 Local 2458
 Local 3000
 Local 3003
 Local 3005
 Local 3019
 Local 4000
 Local 4050
 Local 4207
 Local 4209
 Local 4212
 Local 4234
 Local 4268
 Local 4278
 Local 4300
 Local 4304
 Local 4600
 Local 4606
 Local 5454
 FFAW/CAW
 CAW/MWF Local 1

External links
 Canadian Auto Workers Official Website

Local
Unifor
Lists of trade union locals